Scott Smith (born 14 February 1992) is a Scottish footballer, who played for Hibernian, Brechin City, Dumbarton and East Fife.

Career
Born in Edinburgh, Smith made his debut for Hibernian on 23 August 2011, in the Scottish League Cup second round tie against Berwick Rangers at Easter Road. A few days later, Smith was loaned to Brechin City. Smith signed a new contract with Hibs in June 2012. He played for the Hibs under-20 team during the early part of the 2012–13 season. On 31 August 2012, Smith was loaned to East Fife, initially for one month.

Later in the 2012–13 season, Smith was loaned to First Division club Dumbarton. Towards the end of the season, Smith made an agreement to sign for Dumbarton on a permanent basis from 1 July 2013. After only 6 appearances as a signed player he was released in May 2014. He signed for East Fife in July 2014.

Smith represented the Scotland U16, U17 and U19 teams.

Career statistics

References

External links

1992 births
Living people
Scottish footballers
Association football defenders
Footballers from Edinburgh
Scotland youth international footballers
Hibernian F.C. players
Brechin City F.C. players
East Fife F.C. players
Dumbarton F.C. players
Scottish Football League players
Scottish Professional Football League players